Tagetes nelsonii is a Mexican species of marigold in the family Asteraceae. It is native to Guatemala and to the State of Chiapas in southern Mexico.

Tagetes nelsonii is a hairless annual herb from 50 cm (20 inches) to 2m (6 feet) tall. Leaves are pinnately compound with 3-7 leaflets. The plant produces numerous small flower heads in a flat-topped array, each containing 5-6 yellow ray florets surrounding 9-12 greenish-yellow disc florets. Also known as the citrus scented marigold, 'Tagetes nelsonii is considered an edible flower and is often eaten raw.

References

External links
The National Gardening Association Plant Database

nelsonii
Flora of Guatemala
Flora of Chiapas
Plants described in 1903